Edgar M. Church (born May 24, 1875) was an American college football player and coach. He served as the head football coach at Union College in Schenectady, New York for one season, in 1895.

References

External links
 Sports-Reference profile

1870s births
Year of death missing
Penn Quakers football players
Union Dutchmen football coaches
Sportspeople from Philadelphia
Players of American football from Philadelphia